Irma Urrila (born 29 January 1943) is a Finnish operatic soprano, best known internationally for her role as Pamina in Ingmar Bergman's 1975 film production of Mozart's opera, The Magic Flute.

Urrila was born in Helsinki. In 1967, she sang the role of Marzelline in a film version of Beethoven's Fidelio from the Savonlinna Opera Festival, and in 1978 she sang Tatjana in a film version of Tchaikovsky's Eugene Onegin.

References

External links
 

1943 births
Living people
Singers from Helsinki
Finnish operatic sopranos